Restoration is an extended play by British progressive metal band Haken, that was released on 27 October 2014 through Inside Out Music. It is the first release of the band to feature bassist Conner Green and the second with producer and mixer Jens Bogren, who did his job at his Fascination Street Studios.

Background and recording 

The EP was announced on 8 September 2014 via Haken's Facebook page. The EP's three tracks are reworked songs from their 2008 demo, Enter the 5th Dimension. Commenting on the option of reworking old tracks, guitarist Charlie Griffiths said:

The ending song, "Crystallised"—which is based on the track "Snow", -- is 19 minutes long and features guest performances from guitarist Pete Rinaldi (Headspace) and drummer Mike Portnoy (The Winery Dogs, Flying Colors, ex-Adrenaline Mob, ex-Dream Theater). The band initially said Portnoy would not play the drums nor sing.

Commenting on Portnoy's guest performance, drummer Raymond Hearne said:

The band later promoted a contest in which people were invited to guess what Portnoy did in the song. They then announced the winner and revealed that Portnoy played the gong a few seconds before the end of the track.

On September 24, the band released a promotional video for "Darkest Light". The song is based on the track "Blind", originally clocking at 11:40. According to Hearne, the band managed to produce a half as long version after cutting away "all the excess fat". Both songs serve as the opening track of their respective releases.

The song "Earthlings" is based on the demo "Black Seed".

Track listing

Personnel

Haken
 Ross Jennings – lead vocals
 Richard Henshall – guitars, keyboards
 Charlie Griffiths – guitars
 Conner Green – bass
 Diego Tejeida – keyboards, sound design
 Raymond Hearne – drums, backing vocals

Additional Musicians
 Pete Rinaldi – acoustic guitar 
 Mike Portnoy – gong 

Production and design
 Jerry Guidroz – recording 
 Anthony Leung – recording 
 Jens Bogren – mixing, mastering
Blacklake – artwork, design

References

2014 EPs
Haken (band) albums
Inside Out Music EPs